Diana and Apollo Killing Niobe's Children is a 1772 oil-on-canvas painting by the french artist Jacques-Louis David, now in the Dallas Museum of Art. He produced it to compete for the Prix de Rome. In the Rococo style which marked his early period, it was emblematic of the conflict between David and the Académie royale de peinture et de sculpture jury, which refused him the prize following a pre-arranged vote.

Bibliography
Marie-Catherine Sahut et Michel, David : l'art et le politique, coll. Découvertes Gallimard, vol. 46, Paris, Gallimard, 1988
Sophie Monneret, David et le néoclassicisme, Paris, Terrail, 1998

External links
http://alaintruong.canalblog.com/archives/2008/02/27/8122757.html

Mythological paintings by Jacques-Louis David
1772 paintings
Paintings of Apollo
Horses in art
Paintings in the collection of the Dallas Museum of Art